Juho Evert Koskelo (also known as John Koskelo, July 23, 1870 – November 7, 1942), was a Finnish-American singer and cellist. He was the most popular Finnish-American singer in the 1910s.

Koskelo, who was born in Kuopio, started his career as a military musician and later played with the Berlin Philharmonic. In Berlin he met Heikki Klemetti, who suggested that he go to America. Koskelo gave his first American performance in Calumet, Michigan in 1910, after which he toured, singing in Finnish and German. He moved to New York City later in 1910 and immediately started to make recordings for His Master's Voice, Columbia Records, the Victor Talking Machine Company, and the Gramophone Company. As a singer, he made 112 recordings between 1910 and 1923. Mostly he sang folk songs, marches, hymns and industrial folk music. Some of his songs were written by the famous cuplé singer J. Alfred Tanner.

Koskelo's career ended because of a stroke in 1923, and he died as a forgotten artist at a hospital in New York in 1942.

References

External links
 Juho Koskelo recordings at the Discography of American Historical Recordings.

1870 births
1942 deaths
20th-century Finnish  male singers
Finnish emigrants to the United States (1809–1917)
People from Kuopio